An election to Dublin City Council took place on 20 June 1985 as part of that year's Irish local elections. 52 councillors were elected from twelve electoral divisions by PR-STV voting for a six-year term of office.

Results by party

Results by Electoral Area

Artane

Ballyfermot

Cabra

Clontarf

Crumlin

Donaghmede

Drumcondra

Finglas

North Inner City

Pembroke

Rathmines

South Inner City

References

External links

 https://opac.oireachtas.ie/knowvation/app/consolidatedSearch/#search/v=grid,c=1,q=qs%3D%5Blocal%20elections%5D%2CqueryType%3D%5B16%5D,sm=s,l=library3_lib
 Official website
 irishelectionliterature
 http://irelandelection.com/council.php?elecid=171&tab=constit&detail=yes&electype=5&councilid=7&electype=5

1985 Irish local elections
19985
1980s in Dublin (city)